The SPAD S.XII or SPAD 12 was a French single-seat biplane fighter aircraft of the First World War developed from the successful SPAD VII by Louis Béchereau, chief designer of the Société Pour L'Aviation et ses Dérivés (SPAD).

Development 
The SPAD XII was inspired by the ideas of French flying ace Georges Guynemer, who proposed that a manoeuvrable single-seat aircraft be designed to carry a 37 mm cannon, a weapon which had previously been mounted only in large two-seat "pusher" aircraft such as the Voisin III. Béchereau took his own SPAD VII design as the starting point, but the many major and minor changes incorporated into the SPAD XII made it a quite different aircraft.

The gun chosen for the SPAD XII was not the old Hotchkiss cannon but a new 37 mm Semi Automatique Moteur Canon (SAMC), built by Puteaux, for which 12 shots were carried. The Hispano-Suiza aviation engine had to be geared to allow the gun to fire through the propeller shaft. The SPAD XII also carried a single 0.303 inch synchronized (7.7 mm) Vickers machine gun mounted on the starboard side of the nose. In order to carry the heavy cannon the airframe was lengthened and the wingspan and wing area increased. The wingtips were rounded rather than squared off and the wings given a slight forward stagger.

Test flown by Guynemer, the early production models of the SPAD XII were highly successful after overcoming initial problems with the reduction gear between engine and propeller. Other aces also had success with the new model. However, deliveries were slow, the SPAD VII and later SPAD XIII having top priority, and even the modest total of 300 aircraft which were ordered were not all completed. Best estimates are only 20 produced. Average pilots found the SPAD XII a difficult aircraft to master, and the cannon difficult to aim and fire, while manual reloading was difficult. The cockpit filled with fumes upon every firing. Its breech mechanism protruded into the cockpit and prevented the use of a conventional stick to control the aircraft, adding to the difficulties encountered by ordinary pilots. The control setup reverted to a split setup on either side of the pilot, a la Deperdussin.

Service 

No units were entirely equipped with SPAD XIIs. The unknown number of aircraft produced were issued in small numbers, intended for use only by the most skilled pilots, such as Rene Fonck, Lionel de Marmier, Fernand Henri Chavannes, Henri Hay de Slade, Albert Deullin and François Battesti. They were distributed one or two per squadron. Few were delivered to combat units, eight being recorded on strength in April and again in October; this may be contrasted with the thousands of SPAD VIIs and SPAD XIIIs in service. Single examples for testing were delivered to the Royal Flying Corps and one to the Aviation Section of the American Expeditionary Force, with the AEF's 13th Aero Squadron receiving the code "0", it was primarily flown by the 13th's Charles John Biddle.

Operators

French Air Force
 / 
Imperial Russian Air Force
Soviet Air Force - Postwar.

Serbian Air Force

Royal Flying Corps - One aircraft only.

American Expeditionary Force - One aircraft only, serving with 13th Aero Squadron.

Yugoslav Royal Air Force - Postwar

Specifications (S.XII)

See also

References

Notes

Bibliography

 Taylor, John W. R., and Jean Alexander. "Combat Aircraft of the World" New York: G.P. Putnam's Sons, 1969 Library of Congress Catalog Card Number 68-25459 (Pg.127)
 Bruce, J. M. The Aeroplanes of the Royal Flying Corps (Military Wing). London:Putnam, 1982. .
 Davilla, James J., & Soltan, Arthur M., French Aircraft of the First World War. Stratford, Connecticut: Flying Machines Press, 1997. .
Green, William and Swanborough, Gordon. The Complete Book of Fighters. New York: Smithmark, 1994. .
Guttman, Jon, SPAD XII/XIII aces of World War I. Osprey Publishing, 2002. , 9781841763163.

1910s French fighter aircraft
S.XII
Aircraft first flown in 1917
Biplanes
Single-engined tractor aircraft